Ffernfael ab Idwal or Ithel (died ) was a late 8th-century king of Gwent in southeast Wales.

His name seems to mean "strong ankles". His father was Idwal or Ithel ap Morgan, king of Glywyssing, Gwent, and Ergyng. His father may have divided the kingdom among his sons, with Rhys receiving Glywyssing and Ffernfael, much of Gwent. (Ergyng was apparently lost to Saxon Hwicce around this time.) Alternatively, Ffernfael's brothers Rhodri and Rhys and his nephew Brochfael may have inherited in turn, but lost Gwent to Ffernfael for a time. His queen was Ceingaer.

Ffernfael's death is recorded by the undated Annals of Wales. Phillimore's reconstruction places the entry in the year 775.

Children
 Athrwys, king of Gwent

See also
 Kings of Gwent

References

Year of birth unknown
775 deaths
8th-century Welsh monarchs
Monarchs of Gwent